The 2018–19 New Orleans Privateers men's basketball team represented the University of New Orleans during the 2018–19 NCAA Division I men's basketball season. The Privateers were led by eighth-year head coach Mark Slessinger and played their home games at Lakefront Arena as members of the Southland Conference.  The team finished the season 19–14 overall and 12–6 in conference play.  In conference, they tied for 3rd place with Lamar and Southeastern Louisiana.  As the number four seed in Southland Conference tournament, the Privateers defeated Lamar in the first round, Southeastern Louisiana in the second round, and lost to Abilene Christian in the championship finals game.  Om March 17, New Orleans received an invitation to the College Insider tournament.  Their season ended with an overtime loss to Texas Southern.

Previous season 
The Privateers finished the season 16–17, 11–7 in Southland play to finish in a tie for fifth place. As the No. 5 seed in the Southland tournament, they defeated Texas A&M–Corpus Christi in the first round before losing to Sam Houston State in the quarterfinals. They received an invitation to the College Basketball Invitational where they defeated Texas–Rio Grande Valley in the first round and received a second round bye before losing in the quarterfinals to Campbell.

Roster

Schedule and results
Source

|-
!colspan=9 style=|Non-conference regular season

|-
!colspan=9 style=|Southland regular season

|-
!colspan=9 style=| Southland tournament

|-
!colspan=9 style=|CollegeInsider.com Postseason tournament

See also
2018–19 New Orleans Privateers women's basketball team

References

New Orleans Privateers men's basketball seasons
New Orleans
New Orleans Privateers men's basketball
New Orleans Privateers men's basketball
New Orleans